Alti Palti Sumdit Kalti is an Indian Marathi language comedy TV series which aired on Zee Marathi. It starred Shivani Baokar and Chetan Vadnere in lead roles. It premiered from 7 August 2019 airing Wednesday to Saturday and ended on 11 January 2020 completing 90 episodes.

Plot 
When two fraudsters team up, they leave everyone in town exasperated. With the police and the public after them, the duo must keep getting creative to make a success of their cheating business.

Cast

Main 
 Shivani Baokar as Pallavi
 Chetan Vadnere as Alankar

Cameo Appearances 
 Bipin Surve
 Sakshi Gandhi
 Pooja Pawar-Salunkhe
 Varsha Ghatpande
 Chaitanya Sardeshpande

References

External links 
 Alti Palti Sumdit Kalti at ZEE5

Marathi-language television shows
2019 Indian television series debuts
Zee Marathi original programming
2020 Indian television series endings